ApologetiX is an American Christian parody band from Pittsburgh, Pennsylvania. The band was founded in 1990, and since then, has played in almost all 50 states, released 40 studio albums, and built up a fan club that includes over 65,000 people. The band is currently composed of J. Jackson on vocals, Keith Haynie on bass guitar, Jimmy "Vegas" Tanner on drums, Bill Hubauer and Chris VonBartheld on keyboard, and Tom Milnes and Tom Tincha (a.k.a. "TNT"), both on lead guitar.

The name ApologetiX is a play on apologetics, the defense of a religious doctrine, in particular, Christian apologetics. The word is used in 1 Peter 3:15: "But in your hearts set apart Christ as Lord. Always be prepared to give an answer [defense or "apologia"] to everyone who asks you to give the reason for the hope that you have. But do this with gentleness and respect..." (NIV). Their logo, a triquetra, is an ancient symbol that has been appropriated by Christians to represent the Holy Trinity.

History
ApologetiX has had six official drummers. Jeff Pakula (June 1990 – September 1993), Rick Servocky (November 1993 – April 1995), Bob Flaherty (May 1995 – September 1998), Fred Behanna (February 1999 – January 2001), Bill "Moose" Rieger (March 2001 – January 2005) and Jimmy "Vegas" Tanner (October 2005 – present).

ApologetiX has had multiple other drummers as well, including: their longtime fill-in drummer, Keith Harrold (who played on Isn't Wasn't Ain't and Keep the Change); David McKee (who played on Jesus Christ Morningstar as well as two concerts in 1998); and Jon "Bermuda" Schwartz (the drummer for "Weird Al" Yankovic), who played on seven tracks on Biblical Graffiti. Ron Zanski (two shows in 1993) and Allen Muckle (three shows in 2001) have also played with the band.

According to the band's website, Yankovic himself has told them that he thinks they do "fabulous work".

Since 2014, the band has been following a quarterly release schedule, producing a new studio album about every three months by releasing double singles bi-weekly. From 2014 to 2017, they were able to produce four albums per year. In 2018, their studio computers started to have speed issues, which slowed down the production of their albums. So far they have released two albums, with a third album on its way.

Musical style and lyrical themes
ApologetiX rewrites secular songs with Christian lyrics to create parodies with Christian messages, and, in the song "We're In A Parody Band," ApologetiX refers to itself as a cross between "Weird Al" Yankovic and Billy Graham.

The band's lyrical content is derived solely from Biblical passages and practices, frequently in a tongue-in-cheek manner.  It is also noteworthy that lyrics are often embedded with Scripture references for further exploration of the song's content.

Some of their parodies include:

Band members

Current
J. Jackson - Vocals, lyricist (1990–present)
Keith Haynie - Bass guitar (1995–present)
Bill Hubauer - Keyboardist, producer (1998–present)
Jimmy Tanner - Drums (2005–present)
Tom Milnes - Lead guitarist (2008–present)
Tom Tincha - Lead guitarist (2008–present)
Chris VonBartheld - Keyboardist, Pianist, bgv's (2013–2018)
Rich Mannion - Keyboardist (2018–present)
Former
Karl Messner - Lead guitarist (1990–2007)
Andy Sparks - Rhythm guitarist, Bass (1991–1995)
Jerry Hayostek - Bass guitar (1992–1993)
B.J. Collins - Keyboardist, producer (1997–1998)
Todd Waites - Keyboardist (2011–2013)
Jeff Pakula - Drums (1990–1993)
Luke "Abaddon" Wienecke - Drums (1994–1996)
Rick Servocky - Drums (1993–1995)
Bob Flaherty - Drums (1995–1998)
Fred Behanna - Drums (1999–2001)
David McKee - Drums (2001)
Bill Rieger - Drums (2001–2005)

Session
Steve Kayner - Bass (1993)
Keith Harrold - Drums (1993–2000)
Jon Schwartz (drummer)|Jon "Bermuda" Schwartz - Drums (1999)
Everlife - Vocals (2003)
Janna Jackson - Vocals (2013-)
Elaine Heitzer - Vocals (2014)
Keely Singer - Vocals (2014)
John Marcinizyn - Slide guitar (2016)

 Timeline

Discography

Studio albums

EPs

Live albums

Christmas albums

Compilation albums

Filmography

Awards

 2005 Best CD Award: New & Used Hits: The Best of ApologetiX Vol. 1 & 2 (Christianity Today's Reader's Choice Awards)
 2004 Favorite Indie Artist (CCM Magazine Reader's Choice Awards)
 2002 Recorded Fringe Song of the Year: "The Real Sin Savior" (American Christian Music Awards/ChristianBEATS)
 2004 American Christian Music Awards, Alternative Song of The Year: "Lifestyles of The Rich & Nameless"
 2004 American Christian Music Awards, Outstanding Modern/College Rock Artist

Chart positions of singles & albums

Albums
 Keep The Change
National Christian Retail Bestsellers Rock Chart, published by CCM (#15, November 2001)
 Adam Up
National Christian Modern/College Rock Album Chart, ChristianBEATS (#1, May/June 2004)
 New & Used Hits: The Best of ApologetiX Vol. 1 & 2
National Christian Newest Rock Album Chart, American Christian Music Journal (#1, December 2004)
National Christian Modern/Alternative Album Chart, American Christian Music Journal (#1, December 2004)

Singles

References

External links
 
article from HM Magazine
article from AFA
 Christianity Today - Interview with Apologetix

American parodists
American Christian musical groups
Musical groups established in 1990
Musical groups from Pittsburgh
Parody musicians
Religious parodies and satires
Comedy rock musical groups